In Greek mythology the Styx is the river that forms the boundary between the underworld and the world of the living, as well as a goddess;  and a nymph that represents the river.

Styx may also refer to:

Places
Styx (moon), a moon of Pluto
 Styx, Texas, an unincorporated community in Kaufman County
 Styx Valley, the valley of the Styx River in Tasmania, Australia
 Styx, Tasmania, a locality in Australia

Arts, entertainment, and media

Fictional entities
 Styx, the villains of the Tunnels book series
 Fire LEO-03 "Styx", a fictional starfighter from the videogame Thunder Force III
 Styx and Stone (Jacob Eishorn and Gerald Stone) are two Marvel's fictional comic book characters

Games
 Styx (Spectrum video game), a 1983 computer game released by Bug-Byte Software
 Styx (Windmill game), a 1983 computer game
 Styx: Master of Shadows, a 2014  video game developed by Cyanide Studio
 Styx: Shards of Darkness, a 2017 video game developed by Cyanide Studio

Music

Groups
 Styx (band), an American rock band
 Styx, a UK band involving Bruce Dickinson prior to Iron Maiden

Other uses in music
 Styx (album), a 1972 album by Styx
 "Styx", a song by Witchery from Don't Fear the Reaper

Other uses in arts, entertainment, and media
 Styx (film), a 2018 German film
 Styxx, a novel in the Dark-Hunter series by Sherrilyn Kenyon

Science and technology 
 STYX (gene), a protein tyrosine phosphatase
 Styx (missile) or P-15 Termit, a Soviet  missile
 Styx (protocol), a network protocol of the Inferno operating system
 Styx (butterfly), a monotypic genus of metalmark butterflies in the family Riodinidae

See also
River Styx (disambiguation)
Stick (disambiguation)
Stye